The Acapulco Film Festival was a film festival held in Acapulco, Mexico, annually from 1959 to 1968 and once more in 1987, with a precursor event held in Mexico City in 1958. The festival showcased both Mexican and international films, and in its heyday attracted an array of entertainment industry figures, particularly those from Hollywood in the United States, as well as European cinema.

References

Film festivals in Mexico
1958 establishments in Mexico